The 13th National People's Congress of the People's Republic of China was elected from October 2017 to February 2018 and was in session in the five-year period from 2018 to 2023. It held five sessions in this period, occurring around early March every year until before 2023, when the 14th National People's Congress first convened.

Seat distribution

The first session 

The first session opened on 5 March 2018 and closed on 20 March 2018. All major state positions were elected in this session, including President, Vice President, Premier, and Congress Chairman.

Election results

The second session

The second session opened on 5 March 2019 and concluded on 15 March 2019.

The third session

The third session was scheduled for March 5, 2020, but was delayed due to the COVID-19 pandemic, the first time such a postponement had happened in decades. After the announcement of the date in April, the session was held from May 22 to May 28, 2020.

The fourth session

The fourth session opened on 5 March and concluded on 11 March 2021.

The fifth session 

The fifth session opened on 5 March and concluded on 11 March 2022.

References

External links 
  Official website of the NPC

National People's Congresses
2017 in China
2018 in China
2017 elections in China
2018 elections in China